Manorama Thampuratti was an 18th-century Sanskrit scholar. She belonged to Kizhakke Kovilakam of Kottakkal, a branch of the Zamorin dynasty of Kozhikode. Being a member of the royal family, she was fortunate to get a traditional Sanskrit education, which was not common for women at that time. She mastered the language and so got access to the treasure of knowledge on various sastras at a young age.
She composed several verses in Sanskrit and was known all over Kerala as a gifted poet. However, except for few shlokas, not much is available of her work.

She was also the contemporary of (Dharma Raja) Sree Karthika Tirunal Balarama Varma Maharaja of Travancore (1724–98), who had the title 'Dharma Raja', meaning 'the king of righteousness'. During the time when Malabar was invaded by Tipu Sultan of Mysore, she stayed in exile at Travancore. It was during her exile at Travancore that the king completed the treatise on dramaturgy, viz. Balarama Bharatam, and Manorama Thampuratty offered her comments and suggestions, leading to its fruitful completion.  Her correspondence with king Karthika Tirunal is of historic importance.

References

Indian Sanskrit scholars
Year of birth missing
Year of death missing
18th-century Indian women writers
18th-century Indian writers
Women educators from Kerala
Educators from Kerala
18th-century Indian scholars
Writers from Kozhikode
Indian women scholars
Women writers from Kerala
Scholars from Kerala
18th-century Indian royalty
Indian female royalty